Mossammat Akhi Khatun is a Bangladeshi women's football defender who plays as a centre-back for Bashundhara Kings Women and the Bangladesh women's national football team. She previously played for Bangladesh women's national under-15 football team.

Career
Akhi was the member of 2017 SAFF U-15 Women's Championship winning Bangladesh squad. She scored two goals for a 3–0 win against Bhutan and showed doughty performance throughout the tournament on artificial turf was adjudged most valuable player of the tournament.

International goals

References

External links

Living people
2003 births
Bangladeshi women's footballers
Bashundhara Kings players
Bangladesh Women's Football League players
Women's association football defenders
Bangladesh women's international footballers
21st-century Bangladeshi women
People from Sirajganj District
Bangladeshi women's futsal players